Juan Alberto Mauri (born 29 December 1988) is an Argentine footballer who plays as a midfielder. He also holds Italian citizenship.

Club career
He made his Primera B Nacional debut for Olimpo on 24 October 2009 in a game against All Boys.

In August 2019, after playing a single Serie C season for Lucchese, Mauri joined Serie D club Palermo as a free agent.

Personal life
His younger brother José Mauri is also a football player. Juan signed a four-year contract with Milan shortly after José in a "package deal" as they were represented by the same agent, but never appeared for Milan, even on the bench, before his contract was bought out three years later, in the summer of 2018.

Career statistics

Club

References

External links
 

1988 births
People from La Pampa Province
Living people
Argentine footballers
Association football midfielders
Olimpo footballers
Ferro Carril Oeste footballers
Gimnasia y Tiro footballers
A.C. Milan players
S.S. Akragas Città dei Templi players
Paganese Calcio 1926 players
S.S.D. Lucchese 1905 players
Palermo F.C. players
Primera Nacional players
Argentine Primera División players
Torneo Federal A players
Serie C players
Serie D players
Argentine expatriate footballers